This is the list of number-one tracks on the ARIA Club Chart in 2019, which is compiled by the Australian Recording Industry Association (ARIA) from weekly DJ reports.

2019

Number-one artists

See also
ARIA Charts
2019 in music

References

Number-one singles
Australia Club Chart
2019 Club